Cycling at the 1988 Summer Paralympics consisted of seven road cycling events for men.

Medal summary

References 

 

1988 Summer Paralympics events
1988
Paralympics
1988 in road cycling